Plaxiphora albida, the white Plaxiphora chiton, is a species of chiton in the family Mopaliidae.

Description
The shell of this large chiton is dark green to brown, humped and oval shaped, with eight rough valves. Its girdle is leathery, brown with darker bars and with long bristles.

Distribution and habitat
This species of low-shore chitons is native to south-western Australia, including Queensland, New South Wales, Victoria and Tasmania.

References

External links
WoRMS
 Discover Life
Environment.gov.au
Molluscs of Tasmania
Atlas of Living Australia
N. M. Otway  Population ecology of the low-shore chitons Onithochiton quercinus and Plaxiphora albida
Alasdair P. Lee A new biomineral identified in the cores of teeth from the chiton Plaxiphora albida
D. J. Macey Structural Organisation of the Cusps of the Radular Teeth of the Chiton Plaxiphora albida
 Otway, 1994. Population Ecology of the Low Shore Chitons Onithochiton quercinus and Plaxiphora albida 
 Shaw, Et al., 2010. Tooth Use and Wear in Three Iron-Biomineralizing Mollusk Species 

Mopaliidae
Chitons described in 1825